Surrey Wildlife Trust (SWT) was founded in 1959 as Surrey Naturalists' Trust and it is one of forty-six wildlife trusts covering Great Britain, Northern Ireland, Isle of Man and Alderney. SWT carries out conservation activities on a considerable area of Surrey County Council's large countryside estate and also manages land on behalf of the Ministry of Defence estate. It had an income of £5.1 million and expenditure of £5.7 million.

As of April 2022 the SWT manages sixty-eight nature reserves. Thirty-one are Sites of Special Scientific Interest, nine are Special Protection Areas, eight are Special Areas of Conservation, one is a national nature reserve, twelve are local nature reserves, four are Nature Conservation Review sites, two are Geological Conservation Reviews, five include scheduled monuments and two are listed on the Register of Historic Parks and Gardens of Special Historic Interest.

Surrey is a county in South East England. It is bordered by Greater London, Kent, East Sussex, West Sussex, Hampshire and Berkshire. Its top level of government is provided by Surrey County Council and the lower level by eleven boroughs and districts, Elmbridge, Epsom and Ewell, Guildford, Mole Valley, Reigate and Banstead, Runnymede, Spelthorne, Surrey Heath, Tandridge, Waverley and Woking.

Key

Public access
FP = public access to footpaths through the site
No = No public access
PL = public access at limited times
PP = public access to part of the site
Yes = public access to the whole or most of the site

Classifications
GCR = Geological Conservation Review
LNR = Local nature reserve
NCR = Nature Conservation Review
NNR = National nature reserve
RHPG = Register of Historic Parks and Gardens of Special Historic Interest
SAC = Special Area of Conservation
SM = Scheduled monument
SPA = Special Protection Area under the European Union Directive on the Conservation of Wild Birds
SSSI = Site of Special Scientific Interest

Sites

See also
List of Sites of Special Scientific Interest in Surrey
List of Local Nature Reserves in Surrey

Notes

References

Sources

External links
Surrey Wildlife Trust website

 
Organisations based in Surrey
Wildlife Trusts of England
Environment of Surrey
1959 establishments in England